Jennifer LoveGrove is a Canadian writer, whose debut novel Watch How We Walk was a longlisted nominee for the Scotiabank Giller Prize in 2014.

She has also published the poetry collections The Dagger Between Her Teeth (2002), I Should Never Have Fired the Sentinel (2005), and beautiful children with pet foxes (2017), and has published work in This Magazine, Taddle Creek, Quill & Quire, The Puritan, Now, subTerrain, The Fiddlehead, Canadian Woman Studies and the National Post.

Originally from Dunnville, Ontario, she studied creative writing at York University. She currently resides in Toronto.

References

External links

21st-century Canadian poets
21st-century Canadian novelists
Canadian women poets
Canadian women novelists
People from Haldimand County
Writers from Toronto
Living people
York University alumni
21st-century Canadian women writers
Year of birth missing (living people)